Revue générale de droit is a law journal published by the University of Ottawa. It was established in 1970, and publishes articles in French and English about Canadian law twice a year.

References

External links
 Revue générale de droit from CanLII website

Canadian law journals
Publications established in 1970
Multilingual journals
Biannual journals
University of Ottawa